Heart of a Champion: The Ray Mancini Story is a 1985 American made-for-television biographical sports film starring Robert Blake and Doug McKeon, directed by Richard Michaels and executive-produced by Sylvester Stallone. The film originally premiered on CBS on May 1, 1985.

Plot
The film details the life of Ray Mancini, a World Boxing Association world lightweight champion boxer from 1982 to 1984, Hollywood actor and a member of the International Boxing Hall of Fame.

Cast
Robert Blake as Lenny Mancini
Doug McKeon as Ray "Boom Boom" Mancini
Mariclare Costello as Ellen Mancini
Tony Burton as Grif
Ray Buktenica as Dave Wolf
James T. Callahan as Father O'Neill
Richard Bakalyan as Frank Jacobs

External links

1985 television films
1985 films
1980s biographical films
1980s sports films
American television films
American biographical films
American boxing films
Films about sportspeople
CBS network films
Films directed by Richard Michaels
1980s American films